Ebru Ceylan Uygurtaş (born Ebru Ceylan on 26 May 1987), also known as Ebru Uygurtaş, is a Turkish female volleyball player as outside hitter and libero.

Early life
Ebru Ceylan was born in Ankara, Turkey on 26 May 1987. She studied Physical Education and Sport at Gazi University.

Sport career
Ceylan started volleyball playing with her physical eduvcation teacher's persistency and support at the age of 14. Although started quite late compared to her peers, she closed the gap in a short time with the belief and help of her coaches. She joined the farm team of İller Bankası Women's Volleyball, where she played three years. Then, she was admitted to the A team of the same club. She played seven seasons with her club.

In 2012, she transferred to Çankaya Belediyesi Anka volleyball team. The next season, she moved to Arkas Club.In the 2014-15 season, she went to Çanakkale Belediyespor, where she played two seasons. In 2016, she returned to her initial club İller Bankası. After one season, she signed with Bolu Belediyespor, and played one season. In 2019, she transferred to TED Ankara Kolejliler.

References

1987 births
Living people
Sportspeople from Ankara
Turkish women's volleyball players
Gazi University alumni
İller Bankası volleyballers